Club de Deportes Limache, is a Chilean football club based in Limache. They currently play at the third level of Chilean football, the Segunda Division.

Stadium 
The stadium of Deportes Limache, is the Stadium Ángel Navarrete Candia.

 Direction: Limache, Chile
 Capacity: 3,000

Coach 
  Mauricio Riffo (2013–15)
  Leonardo Vinés (2016)
  Ruperto Rojas (2016)
  Carlos Contreras (2016)
  Jorge Guzmán (2017)
  René Gatica (2017)
  Jeremías Viale (2018)
  Erwin Durán (2018)
  Ramón Climent (2019)
  Ítalo Pinochet (2019-221)
  Mauricio Riffo (2022)
  Marcelo Ramírez (2022-)

Squad
.

Featured Footballers 
  Yonathan Andía (2017)

Honours

Uniform 
 Home Uniform: Tomato-red shirt, tomato-red pants and half black.
 Away Uniform: White shirt, white pants and half white.

Sponsors

References 

Football clubs in Chile
Deportes Limache
Association football clubs established in 2012